Still Be Love in the World is a compilation album released on 1 March 2001 by Sting exclusively at Target stores in the United States. It consists of live recordings and remixes.

Track listing
All songs written by Sting; "A Thousand Years" co-written by Kipper.
 "After the Rain has Fallen" (live) – 4:41
 "A Thousand Years" (Nitin Sawhney mix) – 5:24
 "Perfect Love Gone Wrong" (live) – 6:20
 "Every Breath You Take" (live) – 4:26
 "Fragile" (live) – 4:05
 "Brand New Day" (Cornelius mix) – 5:25
 "Desert Rose" (Melodic club mix radio edit) – 4:45

References

External links

2001 compilation albums
Sting (musician) compilation albums
A&M Records compilation albums